In the Ukrainian culture, vertep (Cyrillic: вертеп) is a portable puppet theatre  and drama, which presents the nativity scene, other mystery plays, and later secular plots as well. The original meaning of the word is "secret place", "cave", "den", referring to the cave where Christ was born, i.e., the Bethlehem Cave "Вифлеемский вертеп" in the liturgy of the Russian Orthodox Church. In the 17th century, the vertep arrived in the Russian Empire after the Ukrainian Cossack Hetmanate, where it was known as szopka, became a Protectorat of the empire in 1654 (it was formerly part of the Polish–Lithuanian Commonwealth).

In Belarusian culture it is known as  Batlejka (батлейка), from "Bethlehem".

A typical vertep was a wooden box, one or two storeyed. The floors had slots through which the puppeteers controlled wooden puppets. The upper floor of the two-storeyed box was used for the nativity scene, while the lower was for interludes and other mystery plays (most often featuring the Herod and Rachel plots) and secular plays, often of comedy character.

After the Russian Revolution of 1917, the atheistic Soviet state severely persecuted religion and the associated elements of culture, and by 1930s the tradition of Christmas verteps was virtually eliminated.

Ukraine 

The Ukrainian vertep, or puppet theatre, first appeared in the latter half of the 16th century, beginning of the 17th century from a popular Western European mystery play. It is believed that it was introduced by a student of the Kyiv-Mohyla Academy. The vertep puppet theatre was made familiar to Ukrainian rural communities by wandering deacons and students of the above-mentioned Academy. The Vertep theatre had numerous regional variants. The performance was divided into two separate sections, sacred and secular, with the latter taking the form of either a tragedy or a comedy.

The sacred act was based on the Nativity scene with interludes, while the secular was based on day-to-day life often lampooning the various national traits of the local population with characters such as the Kozak (Ukrainian/Cossack), Liakh (Pole), Moskal (Muscovite), Zhyd (Jew), Tsyhan (Gypsy). Each was accompanied by representative dance music (Kozachok, Krakowiak, Kamarinskaya, etc.) Religious Christmas carols were also sung, often in harmony. Some early verteps told of the destruction of the Cossack Sich.

The vertep box often had the construction of a multi-storey building. The sacred act took place on the upper level (with occasional interludes on the lower floor) and the secular one taking place only on the lower floor.

In recent times at Christmas young children dress as the various characters and act out the  plays of the vertep. This form, following the old tradition of Malanka, is quite popular in Western Ukraine.

Vertep in Ukraine also became heavily intertwined with singing of the Ukrainian Carols (kolyadki).

References 

 Литературная энциклопедия 1929—1939, Article "Вертепная драма".
 Entsyklopediya ukrainoznavstva Vol 1. p. 232,  Paris, 1955.

Puppet theaters
Theatre in Russia
Theatre in Ukraine
Theatre in Belarus
Slavic Christmas traditions
Christmas in Ukraine